Nebraska Highway 112 is a highway in southeastern Nebraska.  Its western terminus is at the Kansas border where it continues as K-148 southwest of Odell.  Its eastern terminus is at U.S. Highway 77 west of Blue Springs.

Route description
Nebraska Highway 112 begins at the border with Kansas, where it meets K-148.  The highway heads north through farmland where it meets NE 8.  It runs concurrently with NE 8 heading eastward through Odell.  A few miles outside of Odell, the highway turns to the north again.  It then continues northward until it terminates at US 77 west of Wymore.

Major intersections

References

External links

The Nebraska Highways Page: Highways 101 to 300

112
Transportation in Gage County, Nebraska